The Ford Falcon GT is an automobile produced by Ford Australia from 1967 until 1976 as the performance version of its Falcon model range. Its production was resumed by a joint venture in 1992 and 1997 with Tickford, and then again between 2003 and 2014 with Prodrive, the latter being marketed as the FPV GT & GT-P. The Falcon GT is inextricably linked with the history of Australian sports sedan car production and with the evolution of Australian motor racing.The Falcon GT lineage includes many Bathurst wins and motorsport accolades over its entire production run.

Overview

The GT model was introduced as a performance variant of the Australian Ford Falcon XR series in 1967. They were also offered with the 1968 XT; 1969 XW, 1971 XY, 1972 XA, 1973 XB Falcon ranges. GT-HO ("Handling Option") versions were released with the XW and XY Falcon series, with were essentially further modified homologation specials for motor racing. An XA series HO was abandoned in the early stage of development due to public pressure in 1972 after an infamous newspaper campaign against excessive top speed.

In 1992, after a 16-year absence since the last model, the badge resurfaced with the GT 25th Anniversary model based EB II series Falcon, which was followed by a GT 30th Anniversary model in 1997. Both of these cars were developed by Tickford Vehicle Engineering (TVE), which then opted to instead establish the Ford Tickford Experience (FTE) brand as a more sophisticated alternative to high performance rival, Holden Special Vehicles (HSV), by marketing the "T series" based on the AU Falcon and Fairlane range.

From 2003, with Tickford bought out by Prodrive, FTE was replaced by the new owner's Ford Performance Vehicles (FPV) joint venture with Ford Australia. This change led to the GT badge becoming a permanent fixture of the FPV range, with the aim of more closely competing against rival Holden's HSV. FPV's operations ended in 2014, as part of Ford Australia's end of location production by 2016, with the launch of the last GT-F "351".

XR series

The 1967 XR series was a major shift in the evolution of the Falcon, then still being adapted from its American counterpart for Australian release. The car was noticeably larger compared to the XP model range. For the first time, Ford Australia offered a V8 engine on the range, the 289-cubic-inch engine then in use on the Ford Mustang.

The financing by the Australian Police force for certain testing created an opportunity for Ford to take advantage of the option of the powerful V8 engine, with Ford producing the Police Interceptor Pack Falcon which the Falcon GT was built on.  Two prototype Police interceptors were given to Victoria Police for evaluation, one for the Mobile Traffic Section, and the other for the Wireless patrol. Both were rejected. Modifications to engine performance and stiffer suspension were suggested and adapted the Falcon GT went into production with the police GT variant economically fitted with Falcon 500 external appearance. Australia Managing Director, Bill Bourke, then introduced the GT, based around the success of GT versions of the Ford Cortina. The Falcon GT would be marketed in  the same way as the Cortina GT with the competition arm of Ford Australia preparing production racing cars to race at the Bathurst 500.

A charcoal interior consisting of unique designed seats that were not available on any other model Falcon, wood-grained steering wheel, dash, and matching gear knob with special Stewart-Warner instrumentation. Shock absorbers were also upgraded which added to the sporty specification.

The XR GT was available to the public exclusively with a manual transmission and in the exclusive "GT Gold" paint, with a total of 596 units built. A fleet of eight units was produced in "Gallaher Silver" for promotion of the Gallaher tobacco brand, which had a small keyhole in the right-rear quarter panel under one of the taillights that activated an alarm system connected to the doors and boot. A further five units were also finished in a selection of colors at the request of teams to enter them in racing events, with the 1967 Gallaher 500 winning XR GT painted in Ivy Green.

The factory racing team, led by veteran driver/engineer Harry Firth entered two cars, one for himself and Fred Gibson and the other for the Geoghegan brothers, Ian and Leo, though both supplied their own pit crew and each 'team' prepared its own car. After a day-long battle against three Alfa Romeos at Bathurst in 1967, the team emerged with a 1–2 team victory (with Firth and Gibson winning by 11 seconds) which captured the public imagination and sales figures soared. The move forced General Motors-Holden and Chrysler Australia to respond with their own performance editions of their large sedan in 1968 when neither had such vehicles planned, beginning the era of the Australian Falcon GT legend.

XT series

The XT Falcon had an increase in capacity of the Windsor V8 to 302 in3. The color range was also increased, and sales doubled the number of the previous range. The XT won the Teams Prize in the 1968 London-Sydney Marathon finishing third, fifth, and eighth in the event, against more rally-focused opposition.

XW series

Ford introduced the HO (high output—quite often erroneously referred to as "handling option") package in the 1969 XW model range, creating a two-tier range, with the HO package essentially a road-registerable racing car for the leading production touring car teams to exploit.

GT-HO
The first GT-HO variant produced  due to a larger carburetor, and changes to the camshaft and intake. Changes also were made to the suspension, including stiffer shock absorbers and springs and larger-diameter roll bars. Despite the changes made, at the 1969 Hardie-Ferodo 500 poor tyre performance meant that drivers had to pit regularly over the opposition. However, a privately entered XW GT-HO of Bruce McPhee and Barry Mulholland claimed second outright.

GT-HO Phase II
In 1970, the Cleveland V8 engine replaced the previous Windsor engines, the 351 cubic-inch Cleveland engine was first used in a small batch of Phase 1 specification XW GT's, these are retrospectively referred to as "Phase 1.5s". Ford modified the engine in the Phase II, with a larger carburetor (700cfm) over the Cleveland's original 600 cfm version. Allan Moffat claimed his first Bathurst win at the hands of a Phase II at the 1970 Hardie-Ferodo 500, with Bruce McPhee second, giving Ford Works Team a 1 - 2 finish.

XY series

Almost a year after the release of the XY Falcon, Ford released the 1971 XY GT. Among the visual changes to the normal Falcon range, the XY received the "shaker scoop" ram-air intake from the 1969-70 Mach 1 Mustang. An XY GT starred in the Australian movie Running on Empty, as a GT-HO Phase III.

GT-HO Phase III
The homologation specials reached their zenith with the Ford Falcon GTHO Phase III in 1971, a car which Allan Moffat used to defeat all opposition in the 1971 Bathurst enduro and remained one of the fastest four-door production sedan in the world, Maserati QP was much faster until the introduction of the Lotus Carlton 19 years later, with a 6-cylinder engine.

A fear campaign against the homologation specials started with headlines of "160 MPH Street Cars Soon!" led to Ford dropping production with the planned Falcon GT HO Phase IV. For their own part, touring car racing regulations were altered, creating the 1973 Group C regulations, which allowed production cars to be modified for racing independently of the road-going cars, reducing pressure on manufacturers to put racing modifications into the road cars.

A Ford Falcon GTHO Phase III was the most expensive Australian vehicle sold at auction, selling for A$750,000. A previous sale had been for A$683,650.

XA series

The GT model was continued with the new Australian-designed XA, and for the first time, the GT was available as a two-door hardtop. The GT received unique front fenders with dummy air vents on the leading edges, and a bonnet featuring NACA-style ducts. Purchasers were now offered a larger range of colour combinations, with the GT black-outs on the bonnet and lower edges of the car now available in silver.

GT-HO Phase IV

Ford developed the HO series further with the XA Falcon, and were ready to produce the Phase IV to homologate the car for Group E Series Production Touring Cars racing, including the 1972 Hardie-Ferodo 500. On Sunday, 25 June 1972, the front page of the Sun-Herald set off a chain of responses from the New South Wales Minister for Transport, Milton Morris, who called for the ban of these supercars just three days after the news article.

On Thursday 29 June, the Confederation of Australian Motor Sport (CAMS) announced that the end of the current Group E Series Production Touring Cars regulations, which would be replaced by new Group C regulations for 1973. Group C allowed modified versions of road cars to compete, removing the need for manufactures to develop road-going race specials.

The following Sunday, 2 July, Ford announced the cancellation of the Phase IV program. At this stage, one production car had been sent down the line, and three XA GT sedans were in various stages of construction to Phase IV specs at Ford Special Vehicles, Ford's internal race division. Only one of these cars was ever used in competition, with one sold to rally driver Bruce Hodgson, and eventually was destroyed in a crash in 1981. The car has since been rediscovered and is undergoing restoration. The other two are in the hands of collectors, with the Gibson car in Queensland, while the car intended for Allan Moffat is in Sydney and sold at auction for $2 million in 2018, setting a record for an Australian sport sedan car.

The sole production car was not sold until the following year, by Jack Brabham Ford, to a Sydney, Australia-based owner, who then had the car resprayed from its original Calypso Green to Zircon Green. The car went through a number of owners until the current owner had the car restored to factory specifications, in a build documented by an Australian Fords publication.

XB series

Launched in September 1973, the XB GT was to be the last Falcon GT for almost 20 years, until the 25th Anniversary EBII GT in October 1992. The XB GT received a new aggressive front end with a twin nostril bonnet, similar to the style found on the '71-'73 Mach 1 Mustang. The XB was the most popular GT model built by Ford with a total of 2,899 (1,950 sedans and 949 hardtops) sold. In August 1975, Ford introduced the John Goss Special , a limited-edition hardtop with a unique color scheme and several GT appearance and interior features, to celebrate the fact that Goss was the only driver to win both the Australian Grand Prix and the Bathurst 1000.

EB II and EL series

In 1991, Ford Australia entered in a joint venture with Tickford, establishing Tickford Vehicle Engineering (TVE) as its high-performance arm. Apart from developing Falcon's XR sports models and fitting certain accessories to the Falcon and Fairlane range (e.g. LPG systems and sunroofs), TVE took advantage of the return of a V8 powerplant since 1982 by releasing  "25th Anniversary" and "30th Anniversary" editions of the Falcon GT, based on the EB II series.

The anniversary years are based from the time of the introduction of the first Falcon GT in 1967 (based on the XR series), and became the first time that a Falcon GT was again available since the last GT of 1973-1976 (based on the XB series). These GTs represented, for the first time, a shift from extreme performance to a refined grand tourer vehicle, as highlighted by their interiors based on the luxury-oriented Fairmont Ghia models.

BA to FG series

After FTE's relative lack of success with its AU series-based T-series models sold between 1999 and 2002, the GT nameplate was revived by Ford Performance Vehicles (FPV), a new joint venture between Prodrive and Ford Australia established in 2003. The FPV GT range was thus available with the BA (2002), BF (2006) and FG (2008) series. The FPV model range generally comprised the base GT (whose subsequent derivative GS justified the absence of a Falcon XR8), higher performance and specification GT-P. In 2008, it was expanded with the luxury-oriented variant GT-E, and between 2007 and 2014, the range was also bolstered by various limited editions. Those BF series models included the:
 GT "40th Anniversary" (March 2007; 200 sedans, 25 of which were exported to New Zealand) to commemorate the first Falcon GT of 1967; it featured: special interior and colour accents, distinctive 19-inch alloy wheels and "R-Spec" handling package

Limited editions based on the FPV FG series included the:

 GT "5th Anniversary" (October 2008; 200 sedans) to commemorate FPV's fifth birthday; launched at the Sydney Motor Show it featured: Lightning Strike (silver) or Silhouette (black) exterior paint with unique striping package, special multi-spoke alloy wheels in Alpine Silver, six piston Brembo brakes and a luxury Nudo leather interior.

 GT "Black" (August 2011; 125 sedans) unveiled at the Sydney Motor Show it was available only Silhouette and was completely painted in that colour (including alloy wheels, exhaust tips and exterior trims) with new matte black stripes, and was powered by a Boss 335 5.0-litre V8 supercharged engine with a maximum power output of 
 GT "R-Spec" (August 2012; 350 sedans and 75 utes) unveiled at the Sydney Motor Show, it was primarily available in Silhouette and striking red highlights and a "C" stripe down each side, echoing the 2012 Mustang "302 Boss" Laguna Seca, and featured the above V8 supercharged engine, "R-Spec" handling package plus wider (9-inch) rear wheels and launch control and could be optioned with an upgraded Brembo braking system
 GT-F "351" (June 2014; 550 sedans and 120 utes) as the "F"inal GT with its "351" badge representing its engine output but also paying tribute to the 351 cubic inch displacement of the engines used in the XW to XB models of the Falcon GT. It inherited the GT R-Spec"'s chassis enhancements and featured black highlights throughout including new matte black stripes.

Model specifications

Ford
These vehicles were built between 1967 and 1976. GT models of either the XC (in lieu, Ford produced the Ford Falcon Cobra range in 1978) or EA were never produced.

Tickford

These vehicles ended a 16-year absence of the GT nameplate from the Falcon range.

FPV

From 2003, these vehicles marked the return of the GT name, now under the FPV marque.

Motorsport

The Falcon GT saw considerable success in the Australian Touring Car Championship, Australian Manufacturers' Championship and the Bathurst 500/Bathurst 1000. The Ford Works Team competed with Falcon GTs from 1967 to 1973.

See also

Pursuit Special

References

External links
Supercars.net forum, retrieved 11 September 2006

Falcon GT Club
The Ford Falcon GT Story at Unique Cars and Parts

GT
GT
1970s cars
Ford Falcon GT
Rear-wheel-drive vehicles
Sports sedans
Cars introduced in 1967
Ford Australia vehicles
Cars introduced in 1992
Cars introduced in 2003